Century 21 was a conservative political party in Andorra.

History
The party first contested national elections in 2005, when it ran in alliance with the Andorran Democratic Centre. The alliance received 10.7% of the vote and won two seats.

In 2005 the parties merged to form the New Centre.

References

Defunct political parties in Andorra
Political parties disestablished in 2005
Conservative parties in Europe